For the Summer Olympics, there were a total of 21 venues starting with the letter 'D' and 20 venues that start with the letter 'E'.

D

E

References

 List D-E